The following monarchs either lost their thrones through deposition by a coup d'état, by a referendum which abolished their throne, or chose to abdicate during the 21st century. A list of surviving former monarchs appears at the end of the article.

See also: Abolished monarchy, List of current monarchs, List of non-sovereign monarchs who lost their thrones


B

Barbados
 Queen Elizabeth II ceased to be Queen of Barbados in 2021 when the country became a republic.

Belgium
King Albert II abdicated in 2013 in favour of his son Philippe.

Bhutan
King Jigme Singye Wangchuck abdicated in 2006 in favour of his son Jigme Khesar Namgyel Wangchuck.

C

Cambodia
King Norodom Sihanouk abdicated in 2004 in favour of his son, Norodom Sihamoni. It was his second abdication.

J

Japan
 Emperor Akihito abdicated in 2019 in favour of his son Naruhito.

K

Kuwait
Emir Saad Al-Abdullah Al-Salim Al-Sabah, was voted out of office and abdicated at the same time on 24 January 2006.

M

Malaysia
Ismail Petra of Kelantan, Sultan of Kelantan, deemed incapacitated by illness abdicated on 13 September 2010. He was succeeded by his son, Muhammad V of Kelantan.
Muhammad V of Kelantan, Yang di-Pertuan Agong XV, abdicated on 6 January 2019 without reason given. He remains the Sultan of Kelantan.
Ahmad Shah of Pahang, Sultan of Pahang, abdicated on 14 January 2019, succeeded by his son Abdullah of Pahang due to his illness which rendered him incapable of carrying out his duties as ruler. His abdication is decided by the Royal Council meeting.

N

Nepal
 King Gyanendra was deposed when the Nepalese Constituent Assembly abolished the Nepalese monarchy effective 28 May 2008.

Netherlands
 Queen Beatrix abdicated in 2013 in favour of her son Willem-Alexander.

Q

Qatar
 Emir Hamad bin Khalifa voluntarily abdicated 2013 in favour of his son Tamim bin Hamad.

S

Spain
 King Juan Carlos I abdicated in 2014 in favour of his son Felipe VI.

V

Vatican City 

Pope Benedict XVI, sovereign of Vatican City, abdicated in 2013. He was eventually succeeded by Francis.

See also
List of monarchs who abdicated
List of monarchs who lost their thrones in the 20th century
List of monarchs who lost their thrones in the 19th century
List of monarchs who lost their thrones in the 18th century
List of monarchs who lost their thrones in the 17th century
List of monarchs who lost their thrones in the 16th century
List of monarchs who lost their thrones in the 15th century
List of monarchs who lost their thrones in the 14th century
List of monarchs who lost their thrones in the 13th century
List of monarchs who lost their thrones before the 13th century

References

21

Lists of 21st-century people